Wat Phra Chedi Sao Lang (literally 'monastery of twenty stupas' in Lanna Thai) is a Buddhist temple in Lampang, Thailand. The chedis' bases are built in the Lan Na style, and whose upper parts are built in the Burmese style. The temple also houses a 15th-century solid gold Buddha image that weighs .

References

Buddhist temples in Lampang Province
Overseas Burmese Buddhist temples